Jubilee Sports Palace, Sportivniy kompleks Yubileyniy; also translated as Jubilee Palace of Sports, is an indoor sports arena and concert complex that is located in St. Petersburg, Russia. It houses more than 7,000 seats for ice hockey and basketball.

The complex was completed in 1967, as a present from the Federation of Trade Unions, to the city of Saint Petersburg, on the 50th anniversary of Soviet power. The Palace hosts a wide variety of activities, including athletic training and competitions, conventions, festivals, and musical concerts.

History

The arena was originally opened in 1967. The arena was the long-time home venue of the Russian professional basketball club Spartak Saint Petersburg, hosting both the men's and women's team's games. The arena was used as one of the host venues of the 2016 IIHF World Championship. In more recent years, the Russian professional basketball club Zenit Saint Petersburg used the arena to host its home games.

Jubilee Sport Club
The Jubilee Sports Palace's ice rink is home to the Jubilee Sport Club, a training center for figure skating. It is also referred to as SDUSHOR St. Petersburg.

During the 1990s, the rink often had poor-quality ice and other problems, resulting in limited training time, even for the 1994 Olympic champion, Alexei Urmanov.

References

External links

Official website 
Petersburgcity.com
Some information on its history 
Picture of the interior of the arena, when configured for basketball
Picture of the Palace, about halfway down the page

Basketball venues in Russia
Sports venues in Saint Petersburg
Indoor arenas built in the Soviet Union
Indoor arenas in Russia
Music venues in Russia
Indoor ice hockey venues in Russia
Figure skating clubs
Figure skating in Russia
Figure skating in the Soviet Union
SKA Saint Petersburg
Sports venues completed in 1967
1967 establishments in Russia